Dorymyrmex xerophylus is a species of ant in the genus Dorymyrmex. Described by Cuezzo and Guerrero in 2011, the species is endemic to Colombia.

Appearance
Dorymyrmex xerophylus closely resembles Dorymyrmex goeldii, but differs in color, size, and pubescence. The workers have a light brown color with a darker gaster, and have golden hairs.

References

Dorymyrmex
Hymenoptera of South America
Insects described in 2011